Éire Óg, Inis GAA is a Gaelic Athletic Association club based in Ennis, Clare, Ireland. The club plays both Hurling and Gaelic Football at all age levels.

Their most recent major achievement came on 7 November 2021 when they won the Clare Senior Football Championship for the nineteenth time, defeating Kilmurry-Ibrickane by 1–11 to 0–09 in Cusack Park.

Prior to the official club formation in 1952, the Ennis Dalcassians represented the county capital.

Between 1944-1956 and 1994-1995, players from local rivals St. Joseph's, Doora-Barefield joined up with the club to form the Ennis Faughs. Both clubs were competing at lower levels at the time so it was seen as an opportunity to play senior football. The Ennis Faughs competed in thirteen county finals, winning five Senior Football titles in 1947, 1948, 1952, 1954 and 1994. They also won an Intermediate Hurling title in 1945, and an Intermediate Football title in 1946.

When combined with their predecessors, the Ennis Dalcassians, the club are the most successful club in Clare at senior level. A combined total of 34 county senior titles have been won by the capital town, 15 Senior Hurling titles (1990) and 19 Senior Football titles (2021).

In 2018, the club achieved a historic 'Double' when their second teams won both the Clare Junior A Hurling Championship and Clare Junior A Football Championship.

History
The club as it is today was formed at the end of February 1952, initially to cater for junior hurlers. The historic first meeting took place in a house in Steele's Terrace, Ennis. The club's first colours were all-white with a green shamrock on the jersey. These jerseys were purchased by the residents of Steele's Terrace and the Boreen. In 1954 the club colours were officially changed to today's red and white.

In 1974 the club took complete control over the organisation of underage Gaelic Games in Ennis, merging with the underage clubs Ennis Rovers and St. John's, Ennis to form one combined underage club. A number of the 1966 senior winning team had been successful at underage with these clubs, which had won five Minor A hurling titles in between 1961 and 1966, and a three-in-a-row of Under-21 A hurling titles from 1964 to 1966. The underage club has been hugely successful since this merger, winning titles at every grade in both hurling and football, the highlight being the Féile na nGael All-Ireland U-14 Hurling Championship, which was captured by the club's Under-14s in Wexford in 1999.

In 1975 Éire Óg purchased land from St Flannan's College, Ennis at Clonroadmore, where the club is based to this day. Since then a lot of money and hard work has gone into pitch development, building a clubhouse and dressing rooms, and the addition of a floodlit all-weather pitch. In 2003 a second playing pitch was developed under a lease arrangement with St Flannan's College, Ennis. In 2020 a 200-seat spectator stand and two permanent dugouts were constructed. The club is now in the initial stages of fundraising for a complete reconstruction of the clubhouse and dressing rooms, as well as a new state-of-the-art gym.

Éire Óg Inis Academy was set up in 2012 following the break-up of the Ennis Urban Board. The academy coaches girls and boys from U-6 to U-16 in the skills of both hurling and football. The club's most successful year to date was in  2017 when they won five county titles and also represented Clare in the Féile na nGael. However, the success of the academy is not measured on county titles alone, as the most important goal is that the children enjoy coming to the club and enjoying a friendly, fun and safe environment.

Hurling
In 1953 the club entered the Clare Senior Hurling Championship for the first time but were knocked-out by Clooney in the first round. In 1954 the club reached their first Clare Cup final losing out to Sixmilebridge. In 1955 the club reached the Clare Cup final once again, overcoming Feakle to win their first major honour. Later that year the club reached both the senior hurling and senior football finals. In the first senior hurling final appearance for an Ennis team since the Ennis Dalcassians won in 1941, the club was defeated by Newmarket-on-Fergus. The Ennis Faughs also reached the senior football final as reigning champions, but relinquished their title to Doonbeg.

In 1956 the club again reached both the senior hurling and senior football finals. While the Ennis Faughs lost out to Cooraclare in the football, the club won its first Clare Senior Hurling Championship, defeating Clarecastle by 4–05 to 2-08. In 1957 the club won back-to-back senior hurling titles for the first time, defeating Whitegate by 5–09 to 2-03. In 1959 the club won its second Clare Cup. The club reached the senior hurling final again in 1959 and 1965, losing out to Ruan and Newmarket-on-Fergus respectively. In 1966 the club reached back-to-back senior hurling finals for the second time, overcoming Whitegate by 2–08 to 1–04 to win their third title and a twelfth overall for the town of Ennis.

In 1975 the club once again reached the senior hurling final only to be defeated by the East Clare amalgamation, Brian Boru's. Their next appearance in the senior hurling final came in 1980 where the club were victorious over Newmarket-on-Fergus. In 1982 the club returned to the senior hurling final, defeating Sixmilebridge by 3–08 to 2-09. In 1983 Sixmilebridge reversed the result after a replay. In 1985 the club were defeated by Kilmaley in the senior hurling final.

In 1990 the club's second team won the Clare Junior A Hurling Championship for the first time. The following week the club won their fifteenth overall senior hurling title, defeating O'Callaghan's Mills by 1–05 to 1-03. The club went on to defeat Roanmore of Waterford, and Na Piarsaigh of Cork, on its way to the Munster Senior Club Hurling Championship final for the first time, where they lost out to Patrickswell of Limerick. All three games took place in Cusack Park, Ennis. In 1992 the club reached the senior hurling final again only to go down to Sixmilebridge.

In 2000 the club reached both the senior hurling and senior football finals. While the club lost out to Sixmilebridge in the hurling, they defeated Doonbeg in the football. In 2002 the club's second team won its second Junior A title. In 2010 the club won their sixth Under-21 A hurling title. In 2011 the majority of that team helped the club win the Clare Intermediate Hurling Championship for the first time since the Ennis Faughs in 1945.

In 2022 the club reached both the senior hurling and senior football finals. In a first hurling final appearance in twenty-two years they came up just short to the reigning champions Ballyea, losing by a single point. Seven days later they defeated Ennistymon in the football final.

Gaelic football
When the club was formed in 1952, they continued the successful amalgamation that the Ennis Dalcassions had with local rivals Doora-Barefield. The Ennis Faughs won the Senior Football in 1947, 1948, 1952 and 1954. In 1971 the club fielded its first football team and went on to the Clare Junior A Football Championship in 1975. The Clare Intermediate Football Championship was later won in 1985. In 1986 the club reached the Clare Senior Football Championship final for the first time but were beaten by Cooraclare.

In 1994 the club once again reached out to its neighbours Doora-Barefield to reform the Ennis Faughs as both clubs were competing at intermediate level. The Ennis Faughs immediately won the Clare Senior Football Championship in 1994 after a replay against Kilrush Shamrocks. In 1995 they reached back-to-back senior football final, losing out to Doonbeg. When the club won the Clare Intermediate Football Championship on their own in 1995, thereby earning promotion to senior level for 1996, the Ennis Faughs were again disbanded.

The club won five Minor A football titles between 1992 and 1999, including a three-in-a-row. In 2000 the club's senior football team came of age when they won the Clare Senior Football Championship for the first time, beating Doonbeg in the county final. The senior hurling team who were also in the county final lost out to Sixmilebridge. A month later the club also won its first Clare Under-21 A Football Championship. In 2001 the club reached back-to-back senior football finals, however Doonbeg reversed the result. The club's second team won the Junior A football title and went on to reach the Munster Junior Club Football Championship final for the first time, where they lost out to St. Michael's/Foilmore of Kerry. In 2003 the club won the Cusack Cup for the first time since the Ennis Dalcassians in 1932.

In 2004 the club lost the senior football final after a replay to Kilmurry-Ibrickane. In 2006 the club won its eighteen overall senior football title, defeating Lissycasey by 2–09 to 0-13. In 2007 the club reached back-to-back senior football finals for the Third time, however Lissycasey reversed the result. The club lost two consecutive Cusack Cup finals to Kilmurry-Ibrickane in 2013 and 2014. In 2013 the club's second team won the Junior A football title. The club won four Under-21 A football titles between 2013 and 2018, including a three-in-a-row. In 2014 the club again reached the senior football final, but were defeated by the reigning champions Cratloe by 2-12 to 0-11.

In 2021 the club won the Clare Senior Football Championship for the nineteenth time, defeating the reigning champions Kilmurry-Ibrickane by 1–11 to 0–09 in Cusack Park, Ennis. In 2022, having lost the senior hurling final seven days earlier, the club defeated Ennistymon by 0-09 to 0-06 to successfully defend their crown and win their twentieth senior football title. It was the first back-to-back for the town since the Ennis Faughs in 1947/1948.

Major honours

Hurling
Munster Senior Club Hurling Championship Runners-Up:
 1990
Clare Senior Hurling Championship: 15
 1956, 1957, 1966, 1980, 1982, 1990
 As Ennis Dalcassians: 1890, 1911, 1914, 1915, 1924, 1928 (with Clarecastle), 1929, 1934, 1941
Clare Senior B Hurling Championship: 2
 2007, 2014
Clare Intermediate Hurling Championship: 4
 2011
 As Ennis Faughs (with Doora-Barefield): 1945
 As Ennis Rovers: 1927
 As St. John's, Ennis: 1958
Clare Junior A Hurling Championship: 4
 1990, 2002, 2018
 As Ennis Dalcassians: 1927
Clare Hurling League Div. 1 (Clare Cup): 2
 1955, 1959
Clare Hurling League Div.4: 5
 1989, 1990, 1995, 2002, 2008
Clare Under-21 A Hurling Championship: 6
 1964, 1965, 1966, 1974, 1977, 2010 
Clare Minor A Hurling Championship: 24
 1967, 1969, 1971, 1972, 1974, 1978, 1989, 1991, 1993
 As Ennis Dalcassians: 1943, 1944, 1945, 1946, 1947, 1949, 1951
 As Ennis Rovers: 1957, 1961, 1962, 1963, 1965, 1966
 As St. John's, Ennis: 1955, 1956
Féile na nGael All-Ireland U-14 Championship (Christy Ring Trophy): 1
 1999

Gaelic Football
Clare Senior Football Championship: 20
 2000, 2006, 2021, 2022
 As Ennis Dalcassians: 1890, 1897, 1899, 1904, 1907, 1909, 1910, 1911, 1913, 1914, 1929
 As Ennis Faughs (with Doora-Barefield): 1947, 1948, 1952, 1954, 1994
Clare Senior B Football Championship: 1
 2019
Clare Intermediate Football Championship: 3
 1985, 1995
 As Ennis Faughs (with Doora-Barefield): 1946
Munster Junior Club Football Championship Runners-Up:
 2001
Clare Junior A Football Championship: 7
 1968, 1975, 2001, 2013, 2018
 As Ennis Dalcassians: 1927, 1943
Clare Football League Div. 1 (Cusack Cup): 3
 2003
 As Ennis Dalcassians: 1929, 1932
Clare Football League Div.2 (Garry Cup): 1
 2018
Clare Football League Div.4: ?
 2018
Clare Under-21 A Football Championship: 5
 2000, 2013, 2014, 2015, 2018
Clare Minor Football Championship: 8
 1979, 1992, 1993, 1994, 1998, 1999, 2012, 2017

Ladies
Éire Óg Camogie Club was established by Michael Brennan in 1967; his senior team enjoyed immediate success, dethroning 9 in a row champions, Killanena, in 1968. The team went from strength to strength, winning 8 senior titles in a row. There followed a two-year gap before Éire Óg captured four more senior titles in 1978, 1979, 1980 and 1981. In the more recent past, the club won the Féile na nGael Division 2 in 2010. Having competed for many years at Junior level, they finally made the breakthrough from junior to intermediate in 2012. Since 2012, the club has enjoyed much success at underage, but, the big prize of senior status continued to prove elusive until 2017, when they claimed the league championship double, defeating Broadford, Clarecastle/Ballyea, respectively. Minor B U21B championships were also won in 2017.

Ladies Football arrived in 2002, with an Under 12 and Junior teams. Barry Donnelly was first chairman, succeeded by Alan Malone, who steered the club until 2014. Others involved were Sharon Malone and Claire Nihill. Shauna Keane and Orla McMahon have been playing members since the beginning, Shauna scoring the very first score for the new club in 2002.

Camogie
 Clare Senior Camogie Championship: 12
 1968, 1969, 1970, 1971, 1972, 1973, 1974, 1975, 1978, 1979, 1980, 1981
 Clare Intermediate Camogie Championship: ...
 2017
 Clare Junior 'A' Camogie Championship: ...
 2010
 Clare Under-21 'B' Camogie Championship: ...
 2017
 Clare Minor 'B' Camogie Championship: ...
 2017
 Féile na nGael Div.2 (Caithlín Ní Thoimín Shield): 1
 2010
 Féile na nGael Div.3: 1
 1986

Ladies Football
 Clare Junior Ladies Football Championship: ...
 2014, 2015
 Clare Under-21 Ladies Football Championship: ...
 2017
 Clare Ladies Football League Div. 3: ...
 2014

Notable players
This is a list of club players who have won major medals with Clare:

Hurling

* Transferred to Kilmaley in 1998.

Gaelic Football

References

External links
Official Éire Óg, Inis GAA Club website

Gaelic games clubs in County Clare
Gaelic football clubs in County Clare
Hurling clubs in County Clare